Hammer is a 1972 blaxploitation film directed by Bruce D. Clark. The film was released following the successes of Sweet Sweetback's Baadasssss Song and Shaft, notable 1971 films that popularized black cinema. It starred Fred Williamson as B.J. Hammer. Williamson went on to become a staple of the genre.

Plot

B.J. Hammer is a boxer who rises up the ranks with help from the Mafia. However, Hammer doesn't realize that the help comes with a price: He is asked to throw a fight. Gangsters threaten to harm his girlfriend in an attempt to force him to go through with their plan. Hammer is forced to figure out a way to save his dignity and the life of his girlfriend when she is kidnapped by the gangsters.

Cast
 Fred Williamson as B.J. Hammer
 Bernie Hamilton as Davis
 Vonetta McGee as Lois
 Charles Lampkin as Sid "Big Sid"
 William Smith as Brenner
 Elizabeth Harding as Rhoda
 Mel Stewart as Professor
 Stack Pierce as "Roughhouse"
 John Quade as Riley
 D'Urville Martin as Sonny
 Leon Isaac as Bobby Williams

Reception and legacy
The movie gained a positive reception. "The Hammer" has become Williamson's official nickname, earned during his time playing professional football. Williamson is also credited as playing "Hammer, the ladies man," in the 1980 martial arts film Fist of Fear, Touch of Death and as "The Hammer" in a 2006 direct-to-video release called Spaced Out.

Releases on DVD & HD
 In 2004 it was released on DVD.
 In 2010 it was digitized in High Definition (1080i) and broadcast on MGM HD.
 In 2015 it was released on Blu-Ray DVD by Olive Films.

References

External links 
 
 

1972 films
Blaxploitation films
1972 crime drama films
United Artists films
American crime drama films
Films directed by Bruce D. Clark
1970s English-language films
1970s American films